No Sunshine may refer to:

"No Sunshine", a song by DMX from the 2001 soundtrack Exit Wounds
"No Sunshine", a song by Therapy? from their 2018 album Cleave

See also
"Ain't No Sunshine", a 1971 song by Bill Withers